A kayak is a personal watercraft.

Kayak may also refer to:

Places
 Kayak Island, in the U.S. state of Alaska
 Kayak Island (Nunavut), Canada

Other uses
Kayak (band), a Dutch progressive rock band
Kayak.com, a travel metasearch engine
 Kayak PC, a low-cost reference design by Qualcomm